Le Chercheur d'or  is a novel written in French by French Nobel laureate writer J. M. G. Le Clézio and translated into English as The prospector by Carol Marks and published by David R. Godine, Boston.

Plot introduction
Alexis L'Estang becomes obsessed with finding the treasure of the legendary Unknown Corsair on the island of Rodrigues.

The child recalls the sea around the island of Rodrigues in the Indian Ocean. The author situated the plot of this book  in the village of Anse aux Anglais.

Reviews

Taken from the Times Literary Supplement 

The present tense seems to be more frequently employed by modern French novelists than by their British or American counterparts; but few contemporary writers can have resorted to it so consistently as Le Clézio. Concomitant with his absorption in a continuous present is an impulse to unrestrained extension.

exclaims the narrator of his latest novel, the Mauritian Alexis L'Estang, resuming his obsessive search for pirate gold in the Indian Ocean on returning from service in the trenches of the First World War. His story begins in 1892, when he is eight, and spans thirty years; yet despite the dates, the novel is in no sense a historical one, but could be most fittingly described as a fable. Its characters are of quasi-archetypal simplicity, and they communicate in dialogue of taciturn breviloquence. Apart from the narrator's abiding but tenuous relationship with his sister Laure, the novel's principal human interest centres on his chastely erotic idyll with Ouma, the young native girl or "manaf" he finds on the island of Rodrigues, to which plans left him by his father have led him in search of a hoard of plundered gold concealed there by a legendary corsair. Ouma is an archetype of the order of W. H. Hudson's Rima, or Rider Haggard's "Nada the Lily" (referred to early in the book as the heroine of the favourite reading-matter of Alexis and his sister) David Gascoyne (The Times Literary Supplement of October 4, 1985)

From Publishers Weekly

Reed Business Information, Inc.

Review of Contemporary Fiction 

Susan Ireland wrote this (which was published in the "Review of Contemporary Fiction")

The Washington Post

Dominic Di Bernardi of The Washington Post wrote :

Translating J.M.G. Le Clézio
Alison Anderson published this piece in World Literature Today.S he is the translator of J. M. G. Le Clézio's 1991 novel Onitsha.

Publication history

"Journal du chercheur d'or"

Nouvelle Revue Française

"Journal du chercheur d'or."

Nouvelle Revue Française

"Journal du chercheur d'or"

Nouvelle Revue Française

First French Edition

First English Translated  Edition

Interview with Daniel E. Pritchard of Godine
Taken from the  Quarterly Conversation Issue 14 

SE:

Daniel E. Pritchard:

SE:

Daniel E. Pritchard :

References

External links

1987 French novels
Novels by J. M. G. Le Clézio
Novels set during World War I
Mauritian culture
Works by J. M. G. Le Clézio